International criminal law (ICL) is a body of public international law designed to prohibit certain categories of conduct commonly viewed as serious atrocities and to make perpetrators of such conduct criminally accountable for their perpetration. The core crimes under international law are genocide, war crimes, crimes against humanity, and the crime of aggression.

Classical international law governs the relationships, rights, and responsibilities of states. After World War II, the Charter of the International Military Tribunal and the following Nuremberg trial revolutionized international law by applying its prohibitions directly to individuals, in this case the defeated leaders of Nazi Germany, thus inventing international criminal law. After being dormant for decades, international criminal law was revived in the 1990s to address the war crimes in the Yugoslav Wars and the Rwandan genocide, leading to the establishment of a permanent International Criminal Court in 2001.

Background

International criminal law is best understood as an attempt by the international community to address the most grievous atrocities. It has not been an ideal instrument to make the fine and nuanced distinctions typical of national law, for these shift focus from those large scale atrocities that "shock the conscience" with which it is concerned. This creates significant differences of analysis between the legal systems, notably for the concept of legal intent.

History 

Some precedents in international criminal law can be found in the time before World War I. However, it was only after the war that a truly international crime tribunal was envisaged to try perpetrators of crimes committed in this period. Thus, the Treaty of Versailles stated that an international tribunal was to be set up to try Wilhelm II of the German Empire. In the event, however, the Kaiser was granted asylum in the Netherlands. After World War II, the Allied powers set up an international tribunal to try not only war crimes, but crimes against humanity committed by Nazi Germany and Imperial Japan. The Nuremberg Tribunal held its first session in 1945 and pronounced judgments on 30 September / 1 October 1946. A similar tribunal was established for Japanese war crimes (the International Military Tribunal for the Far East). It operated from 1946 to 1948.

After the beginning of the war in Bosnia, the United Nations Security Council established the International Criminal Tribunal for the Former Yugoslavia (ICTY) in 1993 and, after the genocide in Rwanda, the International Criminal Tribunal for Rwanda in 1994. The International Law Commission had commenced preparatory work for the establishment of a permanent International Criminal Court in 1993; in 1998, at a diplomatic conference in Rome, the Rome Statute establishing the ICC was signed. The ICC issued its first arrest warrants in 2005.

Sources of international criminal law

International criminal law is a subset of international law. As such, its sources are those that comprise international law. The classical enumeration of those sources is in Article 38(1) of the 1946 Statute of the International Court of Justice and comprise: treaties, customary international law, general principles of law (and as a subsidiary measure judicial decisions and the most highly qualified juristic writings). The Rome Statute governing the International Criminal Court contains an analogous, though not identical, set of sources that the court may rely on.

The rules or principles applied to a case will depend on the type of body presiding over the matter. National courts may not necessarily apply rules and principles from international law as an international tribunal might. The law as applied by specific tribunals may vary depending on the Statute of the Tribunal. They may also apply national laws if given the authority to do so as the Special Court for Sierra Leone was.

Prosecutions 
The prosecution of severe international crimes—including genocide, crimes against humanity, and war crimes—is necessary to enforce international criminal law and deliver justice to victims. This is an important component of transitional justice, or the process of transforming societies into rights-respecting democracies and addressing past human rights violations. Investigations and trials of leaders who have committed crimes and caused mass political or military atrocities is a key demand of victims of human rights abuses. Prosecution of such criminals can play a key role in restoring dignity to victims, and restoring trusting relationships in society.

James Waller concludes that

Limitations

International criminal law does not, at present, apply to armed opposition groups.

Article 9 of the Nuremberg Charter states:

At the trial of any individual member of any group of organization the Tribunal may declare (in connection with any act of which the individual may be convicted) that the group or organization of which the individual was a member was a criminal organization.

Article 9, which was used to prosecute membership in the Schutzstaffel (SS), allows the criminalization of certain organizations (presumably state-supported) and prosecution for membership by allowing individuals to be prosecuted where evidence was otherwise insufficient. It also has some implications concerning asset seizures, reparations and other payments for damages caused by violations of international law, but does not impose criminal responsibility on organizations in their capacity as organizations. Under Article 9, the SS and several Nazi other organizations were criminalized, including the Leadership Corps of the Nazi Party.

Human rights standards have been applied to these groups in some cases, as the Inter-American Commission on Human Rights in Colombia until 1999. The application of human rights treaties to these groups remains the exception, rather than the rule. Human rights are usually understood conceptually as those rights individuals hold against the state, and some scholars argue that they are poorly suited to the task of resolving disputes that arise in the course of armed conflict between the state and armed opposition groups.

Institutions of international criminal law 

Today, the most important institution is the  International Criminal Court (ICC), as well as several ad hoc tribunals:
 International Criminal Tribunal for the former Yugoslavia
 International Criminal Tribunal for Rwanda
Apart from these institutions, some "hybrid" courts and tribunals exist—judicial bodies with both international and national judges:
 Special Court for Sierra Leone (investigating the crimes committed the Sierra Leone Civil War)
 Extraordinary Chambers in the Courts of Cambodia (investigating the crimes of the Red Khmer era)
 Special Tribunal for Lebanon (investigating the assassination of Rafik Hariri)
 Special Panels of the Dili District Court
 War Crimes Chamber of the Court of Bosnia and Herzegovina
 Kosovo Specialist Chambers and Specialist Prosecutor’s Office
Some domestic courts have also been established to hear international crimes, such as the International Crimes Tribunal (Bangladesh).

International Criminal Court

The International Criminal Court (commonly referred to as the ICC or ICCt) is a permanent tribunal to prosecute individuals for genocide, crimes against humanity, war crimes, and the crime of aggression (although it cannot currently exercise jurisdiction over the crime of aggression).

The court's creation perhaps constitutes the most significant reform of international law since 1945. It gives authority to the two bodies of international law that deal with treatment of individuals: human rights and humanitarian law.

It came into being on July 1, 2002—the date its founding treaty, the Rome Statute of the International Criminal Court, entered into force—and it can only prosecute crimes committed on or after that date. The court's official seat is in The Hague, Netherlands, but its proceedings may take place anywhere.

The court can generally exercise jurisdiction only in cases where the accused is a national of a state party, the alleged crime took place on the territory of a state party, or a situation is referred to the court by the United Nations Security Council. It is designed to complement existing national judicial systems: it can exercise its jurisdiction only when national courts are unwilling or unable to investigate or prosecute such crimes. Primary responsibility to investigate and punish crimes is therefore left to individual states.

To date, the Court:

It 

As of March 2011, three trials against four people are underway: two trials regarding the situation in the Democratic Republic of the Congo and one trial regarding the Central African Republic. Another two people have been committed to a fourth trial in the situation of Darfur, Sudan. One confirmation of charges hearing (against one person in the situation of the DR Congo) is to start in July 2011 while two new cases (against a total of six persons in the situation of Kenya) will begin with the suspects' first appearances in April 2011.

The judicial division of the court consists of 18 judges who are elected by the Assembly of State Parties for their qualifications, impartiality, and integrity, and serve nine-year, non-renewable terms.  The judges are responsible to ensure fair trials, render decisions, issue arrest warrants or summonses to appear, authorize victims to participate, and order witness protection measures.  They elect among themselves the ICC president and two vice presidents who head the court.  The Court has three Judicial Divisions who hear matters at different stages of the proceedings: Pre-Trial, Trial, and Appeals.

Pre-Trial: three judges decide if there is enough evidence for a case to go to trial, and if so, confirm the charges and commit the case to trial.  They are responsible to issue arrest warrants or summonses to appeal, preserve evidence, protect suspects and witnesses, appoint counsel or other support for the defense, ensure that a person is not detained for an unreasonable period prior to trial, and safeguard information affecting national security
Trial: three judges decide if there is enough evidence to prove beyond a reasonable doubt that the accused is guilty as charged, sentence those found guilty, and pronounce the sentence in public, order reparation to victims, including restitution, compensation and rehabilitation

Appeal: five judges handle appeals filed by parties that confirm, reverse or amend a decision on guilt or innocence or on the sentence and potentially order a new trial before a different Trial Chamber.  They also ensure that the conviction was not materially affected by errors or by unfairness of proceedings and that the sentence is proportionate to the crimes.  The appeal judges are also empowered to confirm, reverse or amend an order for reparations revise the final judgment of conviction or the sentence, and hear appeals on a decision on jurisdiction or admissibility, interim release decisions and interlocutory matters

The Court's Pre-Trial Chambers has publicly indicted 41 people, and issued arrest warrants for 33 others, and summonses to eight more.  Seven people are currently in ICC detention.  At the trial stage, there are 23 ongoing proceedings, as 12 people are at large as fugitives, three are under arrest but not in the Court’s custody, and one is appealing his conviction.  Seventeen proceedings have been completed, resulting in three convictions, one acquittal, six had the charges against them dismissed, two had the charges against them withdrawn, one had his case declared inadmissible, and four died before trial.

An example to illustrate the Court’s proceedings is Thomas Lubanga, 51, a Congolese warlord and the first person convicted by the Court for his crimes of recruiting and using child soldiers.  In March 2012, Lubanga was found guilty and sentenced to 14 years in prison for abducting boys and girls under the age of 15 and forcing them to fight in for his army, the Force Patriotique pour la Libération du Congo (FPLC), in the Democratic Republic of Congo’s Ituri region between 2002 and 2003. FPLC recruited children as young as 11 from their homes and schools to participate in an ethnic fighting, and many were taken to military camps, where they were beaten, drugged, and girls used as sex slaves. On 13 January 2006 the ICC Prosecution filed an application for the issuance of a warrant of arrest for Lubanga, which was granted by the Pre-Trial Chamber I on 10 February 2006.  On 17 March 2006 Congolese authorities surrendered Lubanga to the Court, where he was held in their detention center in the Hague until 20 March 2006, where he made his first court appearance to confirm his identity, ensure he was informed of the crimes of which he was accused, and receive a counsel of defense.  From 26 August 2011 to 14 March 2012, the Trial Chamber I, composed of judges from France, the Dominican Republic, and Hungary, heard Lubanga’s case, which included 36 witnesses, including 3 experts called by the Office of the Prosecutor, 24 witnesses called by the defense and three witnesses called by the legal representatives of the victims participating in the proceedings.  The Chamber also called four experts and a total of 129 victims, represented by two teams of legal representatives and the Office of Public Counsel for Victims.  Trial Chamber I unanimously found Lubanga guilty as a co-perpetrator of the war crimes of conscripting and enlisting children under the age of 15 and using them to participate actively in hostilities from 1 September 2002 to 13 August 2003.

International Criminal Tribunal for Rwanda

The International Criminal Tribunal for Rwanda (ICTR), or the Tribunal pénal international pour le Rwanda (TPIR), is an international court established in November 1994 by the United Nations Security Council in Resolution 955 in order to judge people responsible for the Rwandan genocide and other serious violations of the international law in Rwanda, or by Rwandan citizens in nearby states, between 1 January and 31 December 1994.

In 1995 it became located in Arusha, Tanzania, under Resolution 977. (From 2006, Arusha also became the location of the African Court on Human and Peoples' Rights). In 1998 the operation of the Tribunal was expanded in Resolution 1165. Through several resolutions, the Security Council called on the Tribunal to complete its investigations by end of 2004, complete all trial activities by end of 2008, and complete all work in 2012.

The tribunal has jurisdiction over genocide, crimes against humanity and war crimes, which are defined as violations of Common Article Three and Additional Protocol II of the Geneva Conventions (dealing with war crimes committed during internal conflicts).

So far, the Tribunal has finished 50 trials and convicted 29 accused persons. Another 11 trials are in progress. 14 individuals are awaiting trial in detention; but the prosecutor intends to transfer 5 to national jurisdiction for trial. 13 others are still at large, some suspected to be dead. The first trial, of Jean-Paul Akayesu, began in 1997. Jean Kambanda, interim Prime Minister, pleaded guilty. According to the ICTR's Completion Strategy, in accordance with Security Council Resolution 1503, all first-instance cases were to have completed trial by the end of 2008 (this date was later extended to the end of 2009).

On July 1, 2012, an International Residual Mechanism for Criminal Tribunals will begin functioning with respect to the work begun by the ICTR. The ICTR has been called upon by the United Nations Security Council to finish its work by December 31, 2014, and to prepare its closure and transition of cases to the Mechanism.

International Criminal Tribunal for the former Yugoslavia

The International Tribunal for the Prosecution of Persons Responsible for Serious Violations of International Humanitarian Law Committed in the Territory of the Former Yugoslavia since 1991, more commonly referred to as the International Criminal Tribunal for the former Yugoslavia or ICTY, was a body of the United Nations established to prosecute serious crimes committed during the Yugoslav Wars, and to try their perpetrators. An ad hoc court, the tribunal was situated in The Hague, the Netherlands.

The ICTY was established by United Nations Security Council Resolution 827, which was passed on 25 May 1993. It had jurisdiction over four clusters of crime that had been committed on the territory of the former Yugoslavia since 1991: grave breaches of the Geneva Conventions, violations of the laws or customs of war, genocide, and crime against humanity. The maximum sentence it could impose was life imprisonment. Various countries reached agreements with the UN to carry out custodial sentences. The last indictment issued by the ICTY was on 15 March 2004.

A total of 161 persons were indicted by the ICTY during the course of its existence. The final fugitive, Goran Hadžić, was arrested on 20 July 2011. The ICTY's final judgment was issued on 29 November 2017 and the institution formally ceased to exist on 31 December 2017. Residual functions of the ICTY, including oversight of sentences and consideration of any appeal proceedings initiated since 1 July 2013, are under the jurisdiction of a successor body, the International Residual Mechanism for Criminal Tribunals (IRMCT).

Proposed international criminal tribunal for the Russian Federation

The Council of Europe, the European Commission, the NATO Parliamentary Assembly and several governments, including the Government of Ukraine, have called for the establishment of an international criminal tribunal to "investigate and prosecute the crime of aggression" committed by "the political and military leadership of the Russian Federation." Under the Council of Europe's proposal, the tribunal should be located in Strasbourg, "apply the definition of the crime of aggression" established in customary international law and "have the power to issue international arrest warrants and not be limited by State immunity or the immunity of heads of State and government and other State officials." In November 2022 the NATO Parliamentary Assembly designated the Russian Federation as a terrorist organization and called upon the international community to "to take collective action towards the establishment of an international tribunal to prosecute the crime of aggression committed by Russia with its war against Ukraine." In November 2022 the European Commission said the EU will work to establish an ad hoc criminal tribunal to investigate and prosecute Russia's crime of aggression.

See also
Legal Tools (database on International Criminal Law)
Command responsibility
Criminal law
Incitement to genocide
International Criminal Court
International Criminal Police Organization
International law
Rule of Law in Armed Conflicts Project (RULAC)
World Day for International Justice

Notes

References
 John E. Ackerman and Eugene O'Sullivan, Practice and Procedure of the International Criminal Tribunal for the Former Yugoslavia with selected materials from the International Criminal Tribunal for Rwanda. The Hague etc.: Kluwer Law International, 2002, xxi + 555 pp. 
 (fr) Jean Albert (dir.), L'avenir de la justice pénale internationale, Institut Presage, Bruylant, 2018, 383 p.
Daniele Archibugi and Alice Pease, Crime and Global Justice. The Dynamics of International Punishment. Cambridge: Polity Press, 2018, 288 pp. .
 Ilias Bantekas, Susan Nash, Mark Mackarel, International Criminal Law. London etc.: Cavendish, 2001, lvi + 323 pp. 
 M. Cherif Bassiouni, Introduction to International Criminal Law. Ardsley, NY: Transnational Publishers, 2003, xxxvi + 823 pp. 
 Yves Beigbeder, Judging War Criminals. The Politics of International Justice. Basingstoke: Macmillan, 1999, xvii + 230 pp. 
 Charles Jalloh, Regionalizing International Criminal Law?, International Criminal Law Review 9 (3), 445-499 (2009)
 Kriangsak Kittichaisaree, International Criminal Law. Oxford etc.: Oxford University Press, 2002, xxxi + 482 pp. 
 Hans Köchler, Global Justice or Global Revenge? International Criminal Justice at the Crossroads, Vienna / New York: Springer, 2003, ix + 449 pp. 
 Mark Osiel, Making Sense of Mass Atrocity. Cambridge University Press, 2009, vii + 257 pp. . 
 Anatoly V. Naumov and Alexei G. Kibalnik (eds), International Criminal Law. 4th ed. Moscow: Yurait Publ., 2019, 509 p.  
 Francisco-José Quintana and Justina Uriburu, The Americas in and before a Century of International Criminal Law, University of Cambridge Faculty of Law Research Paper No. 11/2022 (2022)
 Lyal S. Sunga, The Emerging System of International Criminal Law: Developments in Codification and Implementation. Kluwer, 1997, 508 pp. 
 Lyal S. Sunga, Individual Responsibility in International Law for Serious Human Rights Violations. Nijhoff, 1992, 252 pp. 
 Gerhard Werle, Lovell Fernandez, Moritz Vormbaum, Africa and the International Criminal Court. Springer, 2014.
 Gerhard Werle and Florian Jessberger (eds.), Principles of International Criminal Law. Oxford etc.: Oxford University Press, 3rd. ed. 2014, 
 Alexander Zahar and Goran Sluiter, International Criminal Law: A Critical Introduction. Oxford: Oxford University Press, 2007, xlviii + 530 pp.

External links

 The International Criminal Court
 The Hague Justice Portal publishes developments in The Hague courts, tribunals and organisations including the International Court of Justice, the Permanent Court of Arbitration, the International Criminal Tribunal for the former Yugoslavia, and the International Criminal Court.
  – provides access to several databases on human rights and international criminal law.
 Cambodia Tribunal Monitor
 Justice in Conflict, prominent international criminal law blog covering current developments, often cited in media including the Washington Post.
 Peace Palace Library - Research Guide